Westbound Mail is a 1937 American Western film directed by Folmar Blangsted and starring Charles Starrett, Rosalind Keith and Edward Keane.

Cast
 Charles Starrett as Jim 'Skinner' Bradley  
 Rosalind Keith as Marion Saunders  
 Edward Keane as 'Gun' Barlow  
 Arthur Stone as Andy  
 Ben Welden as Steve Hickman  
 Al Bridge as 'Bull' Feeney (as Alan Bridge)  
 George Chesebro as Henchman Slim  
 Art Mix as Henchman Shorty 
 Lew Meehan as Henchman  
 Fred Parker as Townsman  
 Bill Patton as Henchman  
 Francis Walker as Henchman

References

Bibliography
 Pitts, Michael R. Western Movies: A Guide to 5,105 Feature Films. McFarland, 2012.

External links
 

1937 films
1937 Western (genre) films
American Western (genre) films
Columbia Pictures films
American black-and-white films
1930s English-language films
1930s American films